Druze Scouts Association in Israel is an Israeli Druze coed Scouting and Guiding association with about 5,000 members. It is the largest Druze youth organization.

The Druze Scouts in Israel are led by Salman Hamud Fallah (1935-2016), who started the organization in 1954. The organization is a member organization of the Israel Boy and Girl Scouts Federation.

Falach returned from study in the United States in 1975 and has headed the association since.

Currently there are Druze Scout tribes in all the Druze villages in Israel, the Golan Heights, Galilee and Carmel. Druze Scouting operates within the school system, and each Druze school has its own troop, from elementary-level through high school.

See also 
 Arab and Druze Scouts Movement
 Druze in Israel

References

Scouting and Guiding in Israel
World Association of Girl Guides and Girl Scouts member organizations
World Organization of the Scout Movement member organizations
Youth organizations established in 1954
Youth organizations based in Israel
Druze community in Israel